Hildreth is an unincorporated community in Madera County, California.

In the late 1870s, Tom Hildreth opened a store at the site, thereby beginning the town named for him. A post office operated at Hildreth from 1886 to 1896.

References

Unincorporated communities in California
Unincorporated communities in Madera County, California